Iceland qualified once for a UEFA European Championship, the 2016 edition. They directly qualified after securing the second spot in their qualifying group, with still four group matches remaining; this meant they would appear on a major tournament finals for the first time in their history. For the draw of the end stage that took place on 12 December 2015, they were seeded in Pot 4.

In Euro 2016, Iceland came second in their group unbeaten (which included a draw against Portugal and a win over Austria). In the round of 16, they famously beat England 2–1. However, they lost 5–2 against hosts France in the quarter-finals.

Also during Euro 2016, Iceland's fans became widely known for their 'volcano clap' (or 'Viking clap') with a 'huh' chant, though it may actually have originated with fans of Scottish club Motherwell F.C.

Overall record

Euro 2016 squad

Iceland announced their final squad on 9 May.

Managers: Heimir Hallgrímsson &  Lars Lagerbäck

Goalscorers

See also

 Iceland at the FIFA World Cup

References

 
Countries at the UEFA European Championship